Anuar Manan (born 11 October 1986) is a Malaysian professional cyclist, who last rode for Malaysian amateur team Amskins Cycling Club.

Career

LeTua Cycling Team
In the same year, he also won one stage in the Azerbaijan Tour and the Tour of Hainan. In the 2008 Jelajah Malaysia, he retained his blue jersey and won three stages.

Azad University Iran
His steady performance attracted several potential suitors and Manan made a decision to join Iranian team . Manan won three stages in the 2009 Jelajah Malaysia and became first rider to win the blue jersey – for the sprints classification – for three successive years.

Geumsan Ginseng Asia
Manan had to leave Iran because of a visa problem and then signed a contract with Korean team . Manan became the first Malaysian rider to win a stage in the Tour de Langkawi, winning stage five, and also became the first Malaysian rider to win the points classification, in the race. He also won two stages in the Tour of Thailand and one each in the Tour of East Java and the Tour of Ganzhou Songcheng.

Terengganu Cycling Team

Champion System
For the 2012 season, Manan was signed by Asian team , joining the likes of Jaan Kirsipuu in the team.

Synergy Baku
For the 2013 season, Manan joined . Prior to the end of 2013, he joined  on a loan move ahead of the Tour of Poyang Lake.

Return to Terengganu Cycling Team

Major results

2007
 Jelajah Malaysia
1st Sprints classification
1st Stages 3 & 6
 1st Stage 9 Tour of Azerbaijan (Iran)
 1st Stage 5 Tour de East Java
 1st Stage 2 Tour of Hainan
 6th Road race, Southeast Asian Games
2008
 Jelajah Malaysia
1st Sprints classification
1st Stages 2, 3 & 5
 1st Sprints classification Tour de Langkawi
2009
 Jelajah Malaysia
1st  Points classification
1st Stages 4 & 5
2010
 1st Stage 2 Tour de East Java
 Tour de Langkawi
1st  Points classification
1st Stage 5
 Tour of Thailand
1st Stages 3 & 4
2011
 1st Stage 4 Jelajah Malaysia
 1st Stage 2 Tour de Brunei
 1st Stage 5 Tour of Hainan
 8th Melaka Governor's Cup
2013
 Tour of Poyang Lake
1st Stages 1, 2, 3 & 4
 1st Stage 1 Tour de East Java
 1st  Points classification Tour of Borneo
 5th Melaka Governor's Cup
2015
 Jelajah Malaysia
1st Stages 3 & 5
 3rd  Road race, Southeast Asian Games

References

External links

Anuar Manan Profile

1986 births
Living people
People from Terengganu
Malaysian male cyclists
Malaysian people of Malay descent
Malaysian Muslims
Cyclists at the 2010 Asian Games
Southeast Asian Games medalists in cycling
Southeast Asian Games bronze medalists for Malaysia
Competitors at the 2009 Southeast Asian Games
Asian Games competitors for Malaysia
20th-century Malaysian people
21st-century Malaysian people